Going Places or Goin' Places may refer to:

Music 
 Going Places (Herb Alpert and the Tijuana Brass album)
 Goin' Places (The Jacksons album)
 Goin' Places (The Kingston Trio album), 1961
 Goin' Places (Michael Henderson album), 1977
 Going Places, an album by Crabb Revival
 Going Places, a 2010 release by Yellow Swans
 Going Places, an album by Máirtín O'Connor Band, 2011

Television and film 
 Going Places, Merv Griffin's mid-1950s television talk show, aired on ABC
Going Places (American TV series), a 1990 situation comedy aired by ABC
 Going Places (Australian TV series), a 2007 behind-the-scenes look at Jetstar Airways
 "Going Places!" (Barney & Friends), an episode of Barney & Friends
 Going Places (1938 film), a musical comedy starring Dick Powell
 Going Places, a 1973 short TV movie featuring Norman Fell
 Going Places (1974 film), a French comedy-drama
 Going Places (upcoming film), an American adaptation of the French film

Other uses 
 Going Places (travel agent), a former UK travel agency brand owned by MyTravel Group